Onthophagus gazella (common names: gazella scarab, brown dung beetle) is a species of scarab beetle. It belongs to the subgenus Digitonthophagus, which may also be treated as a genus. There has been some confusion regarding the application of the name.

Its native distribution is Afro-Asian. It has been introduced to many other parts of the world in order to help remove cattle dung from pastures, with some introductions leading to naturalized populations.

References

Scarabaeinae
Beetles described in 1787
Beetles of Asia
Beetles of Africa
Taxa named by Johan Christian Fabricius